Antonio Archuleta was a Pueblo-American painter from the Taos Pueblo who was known to be painting before the 1930s. Some of his works are in the permanent collection of institutions including the Museum of New Mexico and the School for Advanced Research. Some of his watercolors depict men riding and hunting on horseback.

References 

20th-century American painters
20th-century indigenous painters of the Americas
Native American painters
Taos Pueblo artists
Painters from New Mexico
Year of birth missing
Year of death missing